Steven J. Kachelmeier is the Randal B. McDonald Chair in Accounting at The University of Texas at Austin and a previous editor of The Accounting Review. Dr. Kachelmeier received his B.B.A. from the University of New Mexico and his Ph.D. from the University of Florida. His research and teaching interests include financial accounting, auditing, and experimental economics. Prior to becoming the McDonald Chair he was the C.T. Zlatkovich Centennial Professor at the same university.

References

McCombs School of Business faculty
University of New Mexico alumni
University of Florida alumni
Living people
Year of birth missing (living people)